John David Grey Crichton (8 April 1925 – 2002) was a Scottish footballer who played for Morton, Dumbarton and Airdrie.

Crichton died in Leith in 2002, at the age of 76.

References

1925 births
2002 deaths
Scottish footballers
Greenock Morton F.C. players
Dumbarton F.C. players
Airdrieonians F.C. (1878) players
Scottish Football League players
Association football forwards